Donna Veach is an American politician currently serving as a state representative from the 30th District in the Connecticut House of Representatives. A member of the Republican Party, Veach was elected to the 30th district seat in 2020 after defeating Democratic challenger JoAnn Angelico-Stetson. Prior, Veach defeated challenger Jim Townsley for the Republican nomination for the seat. Veach also serves as a councilwoman on the Berlin town council. Veach currently serves as a member of the House Judiciary and Education Committee as well as the Planning and Development Committee.

References

External links

Living people
21st-century American politicians
21st-century American women politicians
Republican Party members of the Connecticut House of Representatives
Connecticut city council members
People from Berlin, Connecticut
People from New Britain, Connecticut
Year of birth missing (living people)